East Side Militia is the second studio album by Chemlab, released on October 8, 1996 by Fifth Colvmn and Metal Blade Records. Its original title was supposed to be "Jesus Christ Porno Star" (which instead became the name of the second track of the album). It was re-released on November 30, 1999 by Martin Atkins' label Invisible Records with two additional tracks, "Vera Blue" remixed by PIG and "Exile on Mainline" remixed by haloblack.

Composition 
East Side Militia showcases the bands further progression past the widespread use of metal guitars from the last release. The release also leans more towards an electronica and industrial style, with more distortion instrumentally and vocally, including softer melodic parts in the compositions. The song "Jesus Christ Porno Star", a riff on Andrew Lloyd Webber's play of the approximate same name, is an innuendic poke at the Christian religion.

Reception

Aiding & Abetting called East Side Militia laden with "raging beats, accessible tunes and the attitude that is almost unmatched anywhere" and credited it along with the band's debut as "awesome industrial dance albums." Rick Anderson of allmusic praised the band for being forerunners of their genre, saying "the band's 1996 swan song shows them to have been sonically prescient but a bit too nihilistic and vulgar for prime time." Sonic Boom criticized the album's length but commended the personal touches that vocalist Jared Louche brought to the lyrics and said "the music is what one would expect with the band taking so much time between releases, a diverse collection of thickly layered synthcore tracks coupled with a few slower swing style love songs." A critic at Option called the guitar performances by Geno Lenardo of Filter and William Tucker of Ministry brilliant. On the other hand, Scott Hefflon of Lollipop Magazine was largely negative towards the album, criticizing the writing for being dull and describing the music as "new blah-rock with misfiring artsy yearnings."

Track listing

Personnel
Adapted from the East Side Militia liner notes.

Chemlab
 Jared Louche – lead vocals, guitar, arrangements, production
 Dylan Thomas More – sampler, programming, arrangements, cover art, illustrations, production

Additional performers
 John DeSalvo – drums, programming, sampler, arrangements
 En Esch – sampler
 James Galus – turntables, remix (13)
 Amy Gorman – vocals (8)
 Marc LaCorte – sampler
 Geno Lenardo – guitar (4)
 Greg Lucas – sampler
 Solomon Snyder – bass guitar (5)
 Stella Soleil – vocals
 William Tucker – guitar (2, 3, 5-8)

Production and design
 7S – design
 Zalman Fishman – executive-producer
 Jeff "Critter" Newell – production

Release history

References

External links 
 

Chemlab albums
1996 albums
Fifth Colvmn Records albums
Invisible Records albums
Metal Blade Records albums
Metal Mind Productions albums
Albums produced by Jared Louche